Danko Matrljan (born March 4, 1960 in Rijeka) is a former Croatian football striker who played for Croatian HNK Rijeka, NK Pomorac Kostrena, Orijent Rijeka, French club US Orléans and Spanish CD Logroñés.
He is currently working as an assistant manager for the Croatian top division club HNK Rijeka.

UEFA Europa League 
Danko Matrljan scored a goal for Rijeka against Real Madrid in the 1984–85 UEFA Cup on 24 October 1984.

HNK Rijeka Notable Player 
Danko Matrljan had over 130 appearances for HNK Rijeka and had scored over 40 goals in official matches, domestic cup (Yugoslav Cup, Croatian Cup and Croatian Supercup) and UEFA club competitions.

Club statistics

Player

Manager

Honours
Rijeka
Yugoslav Cup
Runners-up (1): 1987

Pomorac Kosterna
Druga HNL
Runners-up (1): 1996–97 (West)
Treća HNL - West:
Winners (1): 1995–96

References

External links
Danko Matrljan scores against Real Madrid at UEFA

Danko Matrljan: 24.10.1984. – Rijeka – Real Madrid 3:1 at Armada Rijeka
Na Kantridi pao veliki Real Madrid! at Rijeka Danas
Danko Matrljan: Novi Kekov Pomocnik at Novi List
Danko Matrljan: 30 godina kasnije: Rijeka ide prema tome da jednog dana igra opet protiv Real Madrida at SportCom

1960 births
Living people
Footballers from Rijeka
Association football forwards
Yugoslav footballers
Croatian footballers
HNK Orijent players
HNK Rijeka players
CD Logroñés footballers
US Orléans players
NK Pomorac 1921 players
Yugoslav First League players
La Liga players
Ligue 2 players
First Football League (Croatia) players
Yugoslav expatriate footballers
Expatriate footballers in Spain
Yugoslav expatriate sportspeople in Spain
Expatriate footballers in France
Yugoslav expatriate sportspeople in France
Croatian football managers
HNK Orijent managers
Croatian expatriate sportspeople in Bahrain
Croatian expatriate sportspeople in Kuwait
HNK Rijeka non-playing staff